The Kosovo Liberation Army (KLA;  , UÇK) was an ethnic Albanian separatist militia that sought the separation of Kosovo, the vast majority of which is inhabited by Albanians, from the Federal Republic of Yugoslavia (FRY) and Serbia during the 1990s. Albanian nationalism was a central tenet of the KLA and many in its ranks supported the creation of a Greater Albania, which would encompass all Albanians in the Balkans, stressing Albanian culture, ethnicity and nation. Throughout its existence the KLA was designated as a terrorist group by FRY.

Military precursors to the KLA began in the late 1980s with armed resistance to Yugoslav police trying to take Albanian activists in custody. By the early 1990s there were attacks on police forces and secret-service officials who abused Albanian civilians. By mid-1998 the KLA was involved in frontal battle though it was outnumbered and outgunned. Conflict escalated from 1997 onward due to the Yugoslavian army retaliating with a crackdown in the region which resulted in population displacements. The bloodshed, ethnic cleansing of thousands of Albanians driving them into neighbouring countries and the potential of it to destabilize the region provoked intervention by international organizations, such as the United Nations, NATO and INGOs. NATO supported the KLA and intervened on its behalf in March 1999.

In September 1999, with the fighting over and an international force in place within Kosovo, the KLA was officially disbanded and thousands of its members entered the Kosovo Protection Corps, a civilian emergency protection body that replaced the KLA and Kosovo Police Force, as foreseen in United Nations Security Council Resolution 1244. The ending of the Kosovo war resulted in the emergence of offshoot guerilla groups and political organisations from the KLA continuing violent struggles in southern Serbia (1999–2001) and northwestern Macedonia (2001), which resulted in peace talks and greater Albanian rights. Former KLA leaders also entered politics, some of them reaching high-ranking offices.

The KLA received large funds from Albanian diaspora organizations. There have been allegations that it used narcoterrorism to finance its operations. Abuses and war crimes were committed by the KLA during and after the conflict, such as massacres of civilians, prison camps and destruction of cultural heritage sites. In April 2014, the Assembly of Kosovo considered and approved the establishment of a special court to try cases involving crimes and other serious abuses allegedly committed in 1999–2000 by members of the KLA. In June 2020 the Kosovo Specialist Chambers and Specialist Prosecutor's Office filed indictments for crimes against humanity and war crimes against a number of former KLA members, including the former president of Kosovo Hashim Thaçi.

Background

A key precursor to the Kosovo Liberation Army was the People's Movement of Kosovo (LPK). This group, who argued Kosovo's freedom could be won only through armed struggle, traces back to 1982, and played a crucial role in the creation of the KLA in 1993. Fund-raising began in the 1980s in Switzerland by Albanian exiles of the violence of 1981 and subsequent émigrés. Slobodan Milošević revoked Kosovan autonomy in 1989, returning the region to its 1945 status, ejecting ethnic Albanians from the Kosovan bureaucracy and violently putting down protests. In response, Kosovar Albanians established the Democratic League of Kosovo (LDK). Headed by Ibrahim Rugova, its goal was independence from Serbia, but via peaceful means. To this end, the LDK set up and developed a "parallel state" with a particular focus on education and healthcare. 

Albanian nationalism was a central tenet of the KLA and many in its ranks supported the creation of a Greater Albania, which would encompass all Albanians in the Balkans, stressing Albanian culture, ethnicity and nation. It was considered a terrorist group until the breakup of Yugoslavia. The KLA itself disavowed the creation of a 'Greater Albania'. The KLA made their name known publicly for the first time in 1995, and a first public appearance followed in 1997, at which time its membership was still only around 200. Critical of the progress made by Rugova, the KLA received boosts from the 1995 Dayton Accords— these granted Kosovo nothing, and so generated a more widespread rejection of the LDK's peaceful methods — and from looted weaponry that spilled into Kosovo after the Albanian rebellion of 1997. During 1997–98, the Kosovo Liberation Army moved ahead of Rugova's LDK, a fact starkly illustrated by the KLA's Hashim Thaçi leading the Kosovar Albanians at the Rambouillet negotiations of spring 1999, with Rugova as his deputy.

In February 1996, the KLA undertook a series of attacks against police stations and Yugoslav government officers, saying that they had killed Albanian civilians as part of an ethnic cleansing campaign. Later that year, the British weekly The European carried an article by a French expert stating that "German civil and military intelligence services have been involved in training and equipping the rebels with the aim of cementing German influence in the Balkan area. (...) The birth of the KLA in 1996 coincided with the appointment of Hansjoerg Geiger as the new head of the BND (German secret Service). (...) The BND men were in charge of selecting recruits for the KLA command structure from the 500,000 Kosovars in Albania." Matthias Küntzel tried to prove later on that German secret diplomacy had been instrumental in helping the KLA since its creation.

Serbian authorities denounced the KLA as a terrorist organisation and increased the number of security forces in the region. This had the effect of boosting the credibility of the embryonic KLA among the Kosovo Albanian population. Not long before NATO's military action commenced, the U.S. Committee for Refugees and Immigrants reported that "Kosovo Liberation Army ... attacks aimed at trying to 'cleanse' Kosovo of its ethnic Serb population."

One of the goals mentioned by the KLA commanders was the formation of Greater Albania, irredentist concept of lands that are considered to form the national homeland by many Albanians, encompassing Kosovo, Albania, and the ethnic Albanian minority of neighbouring Macedonia and Montenegro.

Kosovo War

Between 5 and 7 March 1998, the Yugoslav Army launched an operation on Prekaz. The operation followed an earlier firefight (28 February) in which four policemen were killed and several more were wounded; Adem Jashari, a KLA leader, escaped. In Prekaz, 28 militants were killed, along with 30 civilians, most belonging to Jashari's family. Amnesty International claimed that it was a military operation focused primarily on the elimination of Jashari and his family.

On 23 April 1998, the Yugoslav Army (VJ) ambushed the KLA near the Albanian-Yugoslav border. The KLA had tried to smuggle arms and supplies into Kosovo. The Yugoslav Army, although greatly outnumbered, had no casualties, while 19 militants were killed.

According to Roland Keith, a field office director of the OSCE's Kosovo Verification Mission:

Upon my arrival the war increasingly evolved into a mid intensity conflict as ambushes, the encroachment of critical lines of communication and the [KLA] kidnapping of security forces resulted in a significant increase in government casualties which in turn led to major Yugoslavian reprisal security operations... By the beginning of March these terror and counter-terror operations led to the inhabitants of numerous villages fleeing, or being dispersed to either other villages, cities or the hills to seek refuge... The situation was clearly that KLA provocations, as personally witnessed in ambushes of security patrols which inflicted fatal and other casualties, were clear violations of the previous October's agreement [and United Nations Security Council Resolution 1199].

At one point during the Kosovo War, the KLA changed their tactics from hit and run operations to conventional warfare. In July 1998, the KLA captured the then cities of Orahovac and Mališevo and expanded their occupation of territory to 40% of Kosovo. However, without enough manpower and heavy weaponry to defend their gains, the cities of Orahovac and Mališevo quickly fell to Yugoslav forces. Their occupation of Orahovac was marred by acts of atrocities committed against Serbian civilians. On 24 August 1998, the KLA reverted to guerilla warfare and employed new tactics including the appointment of new commanders, central authorities, expanded training camps and military prisons.

Some sources say that the KLA never won a battle, while others say it won relatively few battles.

Funding

The KLA received large funds from the Albanian diaspora in Europe and the United States, but also from Albanian businessmen in Kosovo. It is estimated that those funds amounted from $75 million to $100 million and mainly came from the Albanian diaspora in Switzerland, United States and Germany. The KLA received the majority of its funds through the Homeland Calls Fund, but significant funds were also transferred directly to the war zones. Apart from the financial contributions, the KLA also received contributions in kind, especially from the United States and Switzerland. These included weapons, but also military fatigues, boots and other supporting equipment.

The KLA received its funding in multiple, decentralized ways. Apart from the Homeland Calls Fund, which mostly went to KLA operations in the Drenica region, the KLA also received donations through personal contacts of commanders with Albanians in the diaspora. Members of the diaspora usually stressed the difficulties through which KLA's soldiers were going through to fight an uneven battle. They often used stories of KLA members or civilian survivors of massacres to convince others to donate. After collection, the money was then transferred to its destination in different ways. The secrecy of the Swiss banking system allowed some of the funding to be transferred directly to the locations where military equipment would be purchased. From the United States, most of the money was legally carried by individuals in suitcases, who reported to the FBI and other federal authorities that they were sending money to the KLA. The KLA also received some funding from the Three-Percent Fund, which was set up by the institutions of Republic of Kosova led by Bujar Bukoshi and was also collected from the Albanian diaspora.

According to some sources, the KLA may have received funds from individuals involved in drug trade. However insufficient evidence exists that the KLA itself was involved in such activities. For example, Swiss citizens believe that elements of the Albanian community in Switzerland control narcotics trade in Switzerland. Some of the money earned through these illegal activities may have gone to the KLA through contributions to the Homeland Calls Fund or through the usual funding channels in which individuals and businessmen engaged in legitimate economic activities donated. This however is insufficient evidence to claim that the KLA itself got involved in narcotics trade or other criminal activities.

In a hearing before the United States House Judiciary Subcommittee on Crime, Terrorism and Homeland Security, Ralf Mutschke from the Interpol General Secretariat claimed that half of the funding that had reached the KLA, which he estimated to have been 900 million DM in total, may have come from drug trafficking. Mother Jones obtained a congressional briefing paper for the U.S. Congress, which stated: "We would be remiss to dismiss allegations that between 30 and 50 percent of the KLA's money comes from drugs." Furthermore, journalist Peter Klebnikov added that after the NATO bombing, KLA-linked heroin traffickers began using Kosovo again as a major supply route. Citing German Federal Police, he said that in 2000, an estimated 80% of Europe's heroin supply was controlled by Kosovar Albanians. According to scholars Gary Dempsey and Roger Fontaine, by 1999, Western intelligence agencies estimated that over $250m of narcotics money had found its way into KLA coffers. Scholar Henry Perritt, who studied the KLA, argues that "[a]ll available evidence refutes the proposition aggressively advanced by the Milosevic regime that the KLA was mainly financed by drug and prostitution money."

Recruitment

In Kosovo 

The original core of KLA in the early 1990s was a closely knitted group of commanders consisting of commissioned and non commissioned officers belonging to reserve, regular and territorial defense units of the Yugoslav army (JNA). In 1996, the KLA consisted of only a few hundred fighters. Within the context of the armed struggle, in 1996-1997 a report by the CIA noted that the KLA could mobilize tens of thousands of supporters in Kosovo within a two to three year time frame. By the end of 1998, the KLA had 17,000 men. Religion did not play a role within the KLA and some of its most committed fund raisers and fighters came from the Catholic community.

Foreign volunteers
Albanian recruits from neighbouring Macedonia joined the KLA and their numbers ranged from several dozen into the thousands. Following the war some Albanians from Macedonia have felt that their military participation and assistance to fellow Kosovan  Albanians during the conflict has not been properly recognised in Kosovo.

Former KLA spokesman Jakup Krasniqi said that volunteers came from "Sweden, Belgium, the UK, Germany and the U.S.". The KLA included many foreign volunteers from West Europe, mostly from Germany and Switzerland, and also ethnic Albanians from the U.S.

According to the Serbian Ministry of Foreign Affairs, by September 1998 there were 1,000 foreign mercenaries from Albania, Saudi Arabia, Yemen, Afghanistan, Bosnia and Herzegovina (Muslims) and Croatia. Citing a 2003 report by the Serbian government, academics Lyubov Mincheva and Ted Gurr claim that the Abu Bekir Sidik mujahideen unit of 115 members operated in Drenica in May–June 1998, and dozen of its members were Saudis and Egyptians, reportedly funded by Islamist organizations. They further claim that the group was later disbanded, and no permanent Jihadist presence was established.The failure of Islamists groups to gain a foothold with the ranks of the separatist movement is related to the secular foundation of Albanian nationalism and the heavily secular attitudes of Kosovo Albanian which didn't leave room for the development of Islamist ideologies.

During the Kosovo conflict Milošević and his supporters portrayed the KLA as a terrorist organisation of militant Islam. The CIA advised the KLA to avoid involvement with Muslim extremists. The KLA rejected offers of assistance from Muslim fundamentalists. There was an understanding within the ranks of the KLA that foreign assistance from Muslim fundamentalists would limit support toward the cause of Kosovo Albanians in the West.

Aftermath (post-1999)
 
After the war, the KLA was transformed into the Kosovo Protection Corps, which worked alongside NATO forces patrolling the province. In 2000 there was unrest in Kosovska Mitrovica, with a Yugoslav police officer and physician killed, and three officers and a physician wounded, in February. In March, the FRY complained about the escalation of violence in the region, claiming this showed that the KLA was still active. Between April and September the FRY issued several documents to the UN Security Council about violence against Serbs and other non-Albanians.

Some people from non-Albanian communities such as the Serbs and Romani fled Kosovo, some fearing revenge attacks by armed people and returning refugees and others were pressured by the KLA and armed gangs to leave. The Yugoslav Red Cross had estimated a total of 30,000 refugees and internally displaced persons (IDPs) from Kosovo, most of whom were Serb. The UNHCR estimated the figure at 55,000 refugees who had fled to Montenegro and Central Serbia, most of whom were Kosovo Serbs: "Over 90 mixed villages in Kosovo have now been emptied of Serb inhabitants and other Serbs continue leaving, either to be displaced in other parts of Kosovo or fleeing into central Serbia."

In post war Kosovo, KLA fighters have been venerated by Kosovar Albanian society with the publishing of literature such as biographies, the erection of monuments and commemorative events. The exploits of Adem Jashari have been celebrated and turned into legend by former KLA members and by Kosovar Albanian society. Several songs, literature works, monuments, memorials have been dedicated to him, and some streets and buildings bear his name across Kosovo.

Insurgency in south Serbia and Macedonia

According to Zhidas Daskalovski, Ali Ahmeti organised the NLA that fought in the Insurgency in the Republic of Macedonia, of former KLA fighters from Kosovo and Macedonia, Albanian insurgents from Preševo, Medveđa and Bujanovac in Serbia, young Albanian radicals and nationalists from Macedonia, and foreign mercenaries. The acronym was the same as KLA's in Albanian.

KLA veterans in politics
A number of KLA figures now play a major role in Kosovar politics.
Hashim Thaçi, the political head of the KLA, is leader of the Democratic Party of Kosovo (PDK) and served a term as prime minister from January 2008. In 2011, he was identified in leaked Western military intelligence reports as a "big fish" in Kosovan organized crime. He was President of Kosovo since 7 April 2016 until his resignation on 5 November 2020. On 24 June 2020 the Kosovo Specialist Chambers and Specialist Prosecutor's Office filed a ten-count Indictment, charging Hashim Thaçi and others for crimes against humanity and war crimes.
Agim Çeku, the KLA's military chief, became Prime Minister of Kosovo after the war. The move caused some controversy in Serbia, as Belgrade regarded him as a war criminal, though he was never indicted by the Hague tribunal.
Ramush Haradinaj, a KLA commander, is the founder and currently the leader of Alliance for the Future of Kosovo (AAK) and served briefly as Prime Minister of Kosovo before he turned himself into the ICTY at The Hague to stand trial on war crimes charges. He was later acquitted. From 2017 to 2020 he was again Prime Minister of Kosovo.
Fatmir Limaj, a senior commander of the KLA, is now the leader of the Initiative for Kosovo (NISMA). He was also tried at The Hague, and was acquitted of all charges in November 2005.

Indictments
Hajredin Bala, an ex-KLA prison guard, was sentenced on 30 November 2005 to 13 years' imprisonment for the mistreatment of three prisoners at the Llapushnik prison camp, his personal role in the "maintenance and enforcement of the inhumane conditions" of the camp, aiding the torture of one prisoner, and of participating in the murder of nine prisoners from the camp who were marched to the Berisha Mountains on 25 or 26 July 1998 and killed. Bala appealed the sentence and the appeal is still pending.

Foreign support
 

The United States (and NATO) directly supported the KLA. The CIA funded, trained and supplied the KLA (as they had earlier the Bosnian Army). As disclosed to The Sunday Times by CIA sources, "American intelligence agents have admitted they helped to train the Kosovo Liberation Army before NATO's bombing of Yugoslavia".

James Bissett, Canadian Ambassador to Yugoslavia, Bulgaria and Albania, wrote in 2001 on the Toronto Star that media reports indicate that "as early as 1998, the Central Intelligence Agency assisted by the British Special Air Service were arming and training Kosovo Liberation Army members in Albania to foment armed rebellion in Kosovo. (...) The hope was that with Kosovo in flames NATO could intervene ...". According to Tim Judah, KLA representatives had already met with American, British, and Swiss intelligence agencies in 1996, and possibly "several years earlier".

American Republican Congressman Dana Rohrabacher, while opposed to American ground troops in Kosovo, advocated for America providing support to the KLA to help them gain their freedom. He was honored by the Albanian American Civic League at a New Jersey located fundraising event on 23 July 2001. President of the League, Joseph J. DioGuardi, praised Rohrabacher for his support to the KLA, saying "He was the first member of Congress to insist that the United States arm the Kosovo Liberation Army, and one of the few members who to this day publicly supports the independence of Kosovo." Rohrabacher gave a speech in support of American equipping the KLA with weaponry, comparing it to French support of America in the Revolutionary War.

War crimes 

There have been reports of war crimes committed by the KLA both during and after the conflict. These have been directed against Serbs, other ethnic minorities (primarily the Roma) and against ethnic Albanians accused of collaborating with Serb authorities. According to a 2001 report by Human Rights Watch (HRW):

The KLA was responsible for serious abuses... including abductions and murders of Serbs and ethnic Albanians considered collaborators with the state.

Elements of the KLA are also responsible for post-conflict attacks on Serbs, Roma, and other non-Albanians, as well as ethnic Albanian political rivals... widespread and systematic burning and looting of homes belonging to Serbs, Roma, and other minorities and the destruction of Orthodox churches and monasteries... combined with harassment and intimidation designed to force people from their homes and communities... elements of the KLA are clearly responsible for many of these crimes.

The KLA engaged in tit-for-tat attacks against Serbs in Kosovo, reprisals against ethnic Albanians who "collaborated" with the Serbian government, and bombed police stations and cafes known to be frequented by Serb officials, killing innocent civilians in the process. Most of its activities were funded by drug running, though its ties to community groups and Albanian exiles gave it local popularity.

The Panda Bar incident, a massacre of Serb teenagers in a café, led to an immediate crackdown on the Albanian-populated southern quarters of Peć during which Serbian police killed two Albanians. This has been alleged by the Serbian newspaper Kurir to have been organized by the Serbian government, while Aleksandar Vučić has stated that there is no evidence that the murder was committed by Albanians, as previously believed. The Serbian Organised Crime Prosecutor's Office launched a new investigation in 2016 and reached the conclusion that the massacre was not perpetrated by Albanians. Many years after the incident, the Serbian government has officially acknowledged that it was perpetrated by agents of the Serbian Secret Service.

The exact number of victims of the KLA is not known. According to a Serbian government report, the KLA had killed and kidnapped 3,276 people of various ethnic descriptions including some Albanians. From 1 January 1998 to 10 June 1999 the KLA killed 988 people and kidnapped 287; in the period from 10 June 1999 to 11 November 2001, when NATO took control in Kosovo, 847 were reported to have been killed and 1,154 kidnapped. This comprised both civilians and security force personnel. Of those killed in the first period, 335 were civilians, 351 soldiers, 230 police and 72 were unidentified.  By nationality, 87 of the killed civilians were Serbs, 230 Albanians, and 18 of other nationalities. Following the withdrawal of Serbian and Yugoslav security forces from Kosovo in June 1999, all casualties were civilians, the vast majority being Serbs. According to Human Rights Watch, as "many as one thousand Serbs and Roma have been murdered or have gone missing since 12 June 1999... elements of the KLA are clearly responsible for many of these crimes".

A Serbian court sentenced 9 former KLA members for murdering 32 non-Albanian civilians. In the same case, another 35 civilians are missing while 153 were tortured and released.

Use of child soldiers

The Convention on the Rights of the Child, adopted by the UN General Assembly on 20 November 1989, entered into force on 2 September 1990 and was valid throughout the conflict. Article 38 of this Convention state the age of 15 as the minimum for recruitment or participation in armed conflict. Article 38 requires state parties to prevent anyone under the age of 15 from taking direct part in hostilities and to refrain from recruiting anyone under the age of 15 years.

The participation of persons under the age of 18 in the KLA was confirmed in October 2000 when details of the registration of 16,024 KLA soldiers by the International Organization for Migration in Kosovo became known. Ten percent of this number were under the age of 18. The majority of them were 16 and 17 years old. Around 2% were below the age of 16. These were mainly girls recruited to cook for the soldiers rather than to actually fight.

Organ theft allegations
Carla Del Ponte, a long-time ICTY chief prosecutor, claimed in her book The Hunt: Me and the War Criminals (2008) that there were instances of organ trafficking in 1999 after the end of the Kosovo War. The allegations have been rejected by Kosovar authorities as fabrications while the ICTY has said "no reliable evidence had been obtained to substantiate the allegations". In early 2011 the European Parliament's Committee on Foreign Affairs viewed a report by Dick Marty on the alleged criminal activities and alleged organ harvesting controversy; however, the Members of Parliament criticised the report, citing lack of evidence, and Marty responded that a witness protection program was needed in Kosovo before he could provide more details on witnesses because their lives were in danger.

In 2011, France 24 obtained a classified document which dated back to 2003 and revealed that the UN knew about the organ trafficking before it was mentioned by Carla del Ponte in 2008.

In July 2014, American attorney Clint Williamson, the former United States Ambassador-at-Large for War Crimes Issues, announced that he and his team had found "compelling indications" that approximately 10 prisoners had been killed so their organs could be harvested. "The fact that it occurred on a limited scale does not diminish the savagery of such a crime," Williamson said, but added that the level of evidence was insufficient to file charges against any particular individual.

Murders
On 24 June 2020, Thaçi, then President of Kosovo, Kadri Veseli and eight other former leaders of the CIA-backed KLA, were indicted by the Specialist Prosecutor's Office (SPO) at the International Court of Justice in Hague. The indictment charges the suspects with approximately 100 murders of Kosovo Albanians, Kosovo Serbs, Kosovo Roma, and political opponents. According to the Specialist Prosecutor it was necessary to make the issue public due to repeated efforts by Thaçi and Veseli to obstruct and undermine the work of the Kosovo Specialist Chambers.

Massacres

 Klečka killings (26–27 August 1998) – 22 burnt bodies were found in a makeshift crematorium; Serbia has attributed the killings to the KLA.
 Lake Radonjić massacre (9 September 1998) – 34 individuals of Serb, Roma and Albanian ethnicity were discovered by a Serbian forensic team near the lake. Serbia has attributed the killing to the KLA and other Kosovan militants.
 Gnjilane killings – The remains of 80 Serbs were discovered after they were killed, allegedly by members of the KLA's Gnjilane Group, who were tried in absentia by a Serbian court and found guilty. A mass grave was found in Čena(r) Česma near Gnjilane.
 Orahovac massacre – More than 100 Serbian and Roma civilians from Orahovac and its surrounding villages - Retimlje, Opterusa, Zociste and Velika Hoca - in western Kosovo were kidnapped and placed in prison camps by KLA fighters; 47 were killed and their grave found in 2005.
 Staro Gracko massacre – 14 Serbian farmers were murdered. Perpetrators were never found.
 Ugljare mass grave – 15 bodies of Serbs found in a mass grave, reported on 25 August 1999 by KFOR. The KFOR exhumed the mass grave on 27 July. 14 Serbs had been shot, stabbed or clubbed.  was a KLA stronghold.
 Volujak massacre – According to Serb authorities, 25 male Kosovo Serb civilians were murdered. Serbia attributes the killings to the KLA "Orahovac group".

In 2003, the daily Serbian newspaper Večernje novosti published wartime photographs of three KLA soldiers with the heads of decapitated Serbs. The newspaper identified two of the three KLA members as Sadik Chuflaj and his son Valon Chuflaj, who according to the newspaper then worked for the Kosovo Protection Corps. Bojan Cvetkovic, a volunteer soldier who had been only on duty for weeks was identified as one of the victims while the Serbian Radical Party later confirmed that soldier Aleksandar Njegovic who was a SRP member, was the second victim out of three other soldiers that went missing at the same time.

Destroyed medieval churches and monuments

Cultural historian András Riedlmayer stated that no Serbian Orthodox churches or monasteries were damaged or destroyed by the KLA during the war. Riedlmayer and Andrew Herscher conducted a survey of Kosovo cultural heritage for the ICTY and UNMIK following the war and their results found that most of the damage to the churches occurred during revenge attacks following the conflict and the return of Kosovo Albanian refugees. In 1999 KLA fighters were accused of vandalizing Devič monastery and terrorizing the staff. The KFOR troops said KLA rebels vandalized centuries-old murals and paintings in the chapel and stole two cars and all the monastery's food.

Karima Bennoune, United Nations special rapporteur in the field of cultural rights, referred to the many reports of widespread attacks against churches committed by the Kosovo Liberation Army. In 2014, John Clint Williamson announced EU Special Investigative Task Force's investigative findings and he indicated that a certain element of the KLA following the conclusion of the war (June 1999) intentionally targeted minority populations in organized ethnic cleansing campaign with acts of persecution that also included desecration and destruction of churches and other religious sites. Fabio Maniscalco, an Italian archaeologist, specialist about the protection of cultural property, described that KLA members seized icons and liturgical ornaments as they ransacked and that they proceeded to destroy Christian Orthodox churches and monasteries with mortar bombs after the arrival of KFOR.

Prison camps
Lapušnik prison camp – Haradin Bala, a KLA prison guard, was found guilty by the ICTY of torture and mistreatment of prisoners crimes committed at the camp.
 Jablanica prison camp – 10 individuals were detained and tortured by KLA forces including: one Serb, three Montenegrins, one Bosnian, three Albanians, and two victims of unknown ethnicity.

Several survivors of KLA run prison camps in Albania have come forward to tell their stories of being kidnapped and transported to these camps where they witnessed the torture and killing of other prisoners. In 2009, eyewitness testimonies from former inmates and KLA fighters described the detention of Albanian, Roma and Serb civilians from the area of Prizren in KLA run prison camps in the Albanian town of Kukës. Despite the prison camp initially being set up, with assistance from the Albanian army, to detain unruly KLA fighters, acts of torture and extrajudicial killings were committed by the KLA against Albanian, Roma, and Serb civilians. According to one former KLA fighter:

It didn't seem strange at the time...but now, looking back, I know that some of the things that were done to innocent civilians were wrong.  But the people who did those things act as if nothing happened, and continue to hurt their own people, Albanians.

Sexual violence
Since the entry of the NATO-led Kosovo Force, rapes of Serb and Romani, as well as Albanian women perceived as collaborators, by ethnic Albanians and sometimes by KLA members have been documented.

Status as a terrorist group

The Yugoslav authorities, under Slobodan Milošević, regarded the KLA as terrorist group. In February 1998, U.S. President Bill Clinton's special envoy to the Balkans, Robert Gelbard, condemned both the actions of the Serb government and of the KLA, and described the KLA as "without any questions, a terrorist group". UN resolution 1160 took a similar stance.

Allegedly the 1997 U.S. State Department's official list of "Foreign Terrorist Organizations" did not include the KLA but the U.S. State Department might have listed it as a terrorist organization in 1998 presumably by the fact that it was financing its operations with money from the international heroin trade and loans from Islamic countries and individuals, among them allegedly Osama bin Laden. In March 1998, just one month later Gerbald had to modify his statements to say that KLA had not been classified legally by the U.S. government as a terrorist group, and the U.S. government approached the KLA leaders to make them interlocutors with the Serbs. The Wall Street Journal claimed later that the U.S. government had in February 1998 removed the KLA from the list of terrorist organisations, a removal that has never been confirmed. France delisted the KLA in late 1998, after strong U.S. and UK lobbying. KLA is still present in the MIPT Terrorism Knowledge Base list of terrorist groups, and is listed as an inactive terrorist organisation by the National Consortium for the Study of Terrorism and Responses to Terrorism.

During the war, the KLA troops collaborated with the NATO troops, and one of its members was called by NATO the embodiment of the Kosovo "freedom fighters". In late 1999 the KLA was disbanded and its members entered the Kosovo Protection Corps. Most states which faced on their territory international activity by the KLA never officially designated it as a terrorist organization.

Investigations for war crimes

In 2005, the KLA commander Haradin Bala was convicted of war crimes and crimes against humanity against Serbs and Albanians by the International Criminal Tribunal for the former Yugoslavia. KLA commanders and later Kosovo politicians, Ramush Haradinaj and Fatmir Limaj were acquitted, but the court noted that there were difficulties because many witnesses were fearful of giving testimonies, while others changed their testimonies and some died in mysterious circumstances. In addition, there were convictions for witness-tampering regarding these two cases.

In 2010, a report by the Council of Europe accused KLA guerrillas of killing civilian Serbs and ethnic Albanian political opponents. Based on the Council of Europe report, the Special Investigative Task Force (SITF) was created in 2011 to investigate the allegations. The SITF chief prosecutor presented his general findings in 2014 resulting in the creation of the specialist chambers in The Hague to adjudicate the cases.

In April 2014, the Assembly of Kosovo considered and approved the establishment of a special court of Kosovo to try alleged war crimes and other serious abuses committed during and after the 1998–99 Kosovo war. The court will adjudicate cases against individuals based on a 2010 Council of Europe report by the Swiss senator Dick Marty. The proceedings will be EU-funded and held in The Hague, though it would still be a Kosovo national court. Defendants will likely include members of the Kosovo Liberation Army who are alleged to have committed crimes against ethnic minorities and political opponents, meaning the court is likely to meet with some unpopularity at home, where the KLA are still widely considered heroes.

In 2017, ten members of the KLA, including Sylejman Selimi who was ex-head of the Kosovo Security Force and later ambassador to Albania, were convicted for war crimes against civilians.

On June 24, 2020, the Kosovo Specialist Chambers and Specialist Prosecutor's Office filed a ten-count Indictment, charging Kosovo President Hashim Thaçi, Kadri Veseli and others for crimes against humanity and war crimes. The prosecutors said that Hashim Thaci and Kadri Veseli repeatedly tried to obstruct and undermine the work of the KSC (Special Court of Kosovo), "in an attempt to ensure that they do not face justice". In July 2020, Thaçi was questioned by war crimes prosecutors at The Hague.

In September 2020, Agim Çeku was summoned by the prosecutors as a war crimes suspect. The same month, the former KLA commander Salih Mustafa was arrested and transferred to the detention facilities in The Hague, based on a "warrant, transfer order and confirmed indictment issued by a pre-trial judge". Mustafa was charged with the war crimes of arbitrary detention, cruel treatment, torture and murder. The same month, Hysni Gucati (Chairman of the Kosovo Liberation Army War Veterans Association) and Nasim Haradinaj (Deputy Chairman of the Kosovo Liberation Army War Veterans Association) were also arrested and transferred to the Kosovo Specialist Chambers's Detention Unit. They were charged for obstructing Special Court of Kosovo officials in performing their duties, intimidation during criminal proceedings, retaliation and violating secrecy of proceedings.

In November 2020, Thaci, a deputy in the Kosovo parliament Rexhep Selimi, the president of Thaci's Kosovo Democratic Party Kadri Veseli and veteran Kosovo politician Jakup Krasniqi were arrested and transferred to the detention center of the Kosovo Tribunal in The Hague on charges of war crimes and crimes against humanity.

In December 2020, the Parliament of Albania decided to create a committee in order to investigate the accusations against KLA of human rights violations in both Kosovo and north Albania where it had bases. Prime Minister Edi Rama accused the opposition chief Lulzim Basha of helping the UN to investigate the KLA and called him a traitor. Basha denied the accusations.

In 2020, Serbian authorities arrested Nezir Mehmetaj at the Merdare. He is accused of participating in war crimes against civilians including murders and burning and looting of private properties in the village of Rudice at Klina during the war. He denied the accusations.

In February 2021, the president of the Kosovo Specialist Chambers, Ekaterina Trendafilova, informed the European diplomats that there were increasing efforts from Kosovo to undermine the court's work and warned about the safety of the witnesses. She mentioned that there were attempts to challenge the law and to pardon those convicted of crimes. In addition she said that Kosovo is trying hard to move the court from Hague to Pristina (capital of Kosovo) and such a move would "risk the lives, safety and security of the people who have or will be willing to cooperate with the court".

In March 2021, Belgian authorities arrested Pjeter Shala, a former KLA commander on war crimes charges.

The United States Country Reports on Human Rights Practices of 2021 reported that "leading politicians, civil society leaders and veterans organisations" in Kosovo were trying to undermine the Hague court.

In May 2022, more charges were added for war crimes allegedly committed in 1998 and 1999 by KLA members at the dormitories in Budakove and Semetishte. According to the final indictment, most of the crimes committed at detention centres in Kosovo and Albania.

In December 2022 Salih Mustafa, who had been arrested in September 2020, was convicted, in The Hague, of the war crimes of arbitrary detention, torture, and murder, but not convicted of cruel treatment due to legal reasons. He was sentenced to 26 years in prison. The Trial Panel also mentioned that the victims and witnesses have showed tremendous courage cooperating with the Specialist Chambers and the Specialist Prosecutor, because they were subjected to threats and intimidation in Kosovo for their cooperation.

Prominent people

Zahir Pajaziti (born 1962), commander, from Podujevo
Ramush Haradinaj (born 1968), commander, also KPC, from Dečani
Agim Çeku (born 1960), commander, also KPC, from Peć
Lahi Brahimaj (born 1970), commander, also KPC, from Đakovica
Sylejman Selimi (born 1970), commander, also KPC, from Drenica
Fadil Nimani (1967–2001), commander, also NLA, from Đakovica
Rahim Beqiri (1957–2001), commander, also UÇPMB and NLA, from Koprivnica
Tahir Sinani (1964–2001), commander, also KPC and NLA, from Bujan
Fatmir Limaj (born 1971), commander, from Mališevo
Abdullah Tahiri (born 1956), commander, from Gjilan
Adem Jashari (1955–1998), commander, founding figure, from Drenica
Njazi Azemi (1970–2001), commander, also UÇPMB, from Vitia
Agim Ramadani (1973–1999), commander, from Gjilane
Tahir Zemaj (1956–2003), commander, from Đakovica
Daut Haradinaj (born 1978), commander, also KPC, from Dečani
Hashim Thaçi (born 1968), staff, from Drenica
Kadri Veseli (born 1967), staff, from Kosovska Mitrovica
Adem Grabovci (born 1960), staff, from Peć
Isak Musliu (born 1970), soldier, from Štimlje
Indrit Cara (1971–1999), soldier, from Kavajë
Mujdin Aliu (1974–1999), soldier, from Tetovo
Naim Maloku (born 1958), soldier, from Novo Brdo
Ismet Jashari (1967–1998), soldier, from Kumanovo
Jakup Krasniqi (born 1951), spokesman, from Drenica

See also
 Albanian Armed Forces
 Armed Forces of the Republic of Kosovo
 KFOR
 Kosovo Police
 Military of Kosovo
 Operation Horseshoe
 1999 NATO bombing of Yugoslavia
 Albanian nationalism in Kosovo
 Kosovo Specialist Chambers

References

Citations

Sources

Further reading 
 
 
 "KLA Action Fuelled NATO Victory", Jane's Defence Weekly, 16 June 1999
 "The KLA: Braced to Defend and Control", Jane's Intelligence Review, 1 April 1999
 "Kosovo's Ceasefire Crumbles As Serb Military Retaliates", Jane's Intelligence Review, 1 February 1999
 "Another Balkan Bloodbath? Part Two", Jane's Intelligence Review, 1 March 1998
 "Albanians Attack Serb Targets", Jane's Defence Weekly, 4 September 1996
 "The Kosovo Liberation Army and the Future of Kosovo", James H. Anderson and James Phillips, 13 May 1999, The Heritage Foundation (Washington, D.C., USA)

External links

  Jane's Information Group
 Kosovo's Army in Waiting Time magazine
 Intelligence Resources page on KLA Federation of American Scientists
 KLA-NATO Demilitarisation and transformation agreement.
 IISS: "The Kosovo Liberation Army" – Volume 4, Issue 7 – August 1998  
 Kosova Press Ex-KLA News Agency, now close to the Democratic Party of Kosovo
 Government of Serbia (2003): White Book on KLA (Part 1, Part 2)
 

 
Kosovo War
National liberation armies
Organizations formerly designated as terrorist
Paramilitary organizations based in Yugoslavia
1990s establishments in Kosovo
1996 establishments in Serbia
1999 disestablishments in Kosovo
Separatism in Serbia
Paramilitary organizations in the Yugoslav Wars